Georgi Dimitrov (born 10 April 1930) is a Bulgarian former alpine skier. He competed at the 1952, 1956 and the 1960 Winter Olympics.

References

External links
 

1930 births
Living people
Bulgarian male alpine skiers
Olympic alpine skiers of Bulgaria
Alpine skiers at the 1952 Winter Olympics
Alpine skiers at the 1956 Winter Olympics
Alpine skiers at the 1960 Winter Olympics
People from Bansko
Sportspeople from Blagoevgrad Province